The 2004 Melbourne Cup was the 144th running of the Melbourne Cup, a prestigious Australian Thoroughbred horse race.

It was won by Makybe Diva at the age of six, trained by Lee Freedman and ridden by Glen Boss.

Field
This is a list of horses which ran in the 2004 Melbourne Cup.

References

2004
Melbourne Cup
Melbourne Cup
2000s in Melbourne
November 2004 sports events in Australia